José Samalot (born 24 March 1947) is a Puerto Rican fencer. He competed in the individual foil event at the 1976 Summer Olympics.

References

1947 births
Living people
Puerto Rican male fencers
Olympic fencers of Puerto Rico
Fencers at the 1976 Summer Olympics